This is a list of music-related events in 1806.

Events
Gioachino Rossini becomes the youngest member of the Philharmonics Society of Bologna, where he starts studying composition
Carl Czerny publishes his first composition at the age of 15.
The marimba is described for the first time by Juan Domingo Juarros, a Spanish historian, in his Compendium of the History of Guatemala.
Johann Simon Mayr founds a new music school at Bergamo, Italy. Gaetano Donizetti is one of its first pupils.
Marcussen & Søn, Danish organ-building firm, founded.
The poem "Twinkle Twinkle Little Star" is published in Rhymes for the Nursery; it would later be made into a popular song of the same name.

Classical Music
Ludwig van Beethoven
Symphony No. 4
Piano Concerto No. 4
Violin Concerto
3 String Quartets, Op. 59
32 Variations in C minor
Johann Nepomuk Hummel
7 Hungarian Dances
12 Minuets
Carl Maria Von Weber – Concertino for Horn and Orchestra
Joseph Wölfl – Piano Concerto No. 5 "Grand Concerto Militaire", Op. 43

Opera
Étienne Méhul – Uthal

Births
January 3 – Henriette Sontag, operatic soprano (d. 1854)
January 27 – Juan Crisóstomo Arriaga, "the Spanish Mozart" (d. 1826)
August 17 – Johann Kaspar Mertz, guitarist and composer (d. 1856)
September 2 – Josef Gusikov, klezmer musician (d. 1837)
November 4 – Anders Selinder, dancer and choreographer (d. 1874)
December 4 – Johann Friedrich Franz Burgmüller, composer (d. 1874)

Deaths
January 30 – Vicente Martín y Soler, opera and ballet composer (b. 1754)
February 23 – John Alcock, composer (b. 1715)
February 24 – Tommaso Giordani, composer (b. c. 1738)
March 23 – George Pinto, composer (b. 1785)
June 14 – Domenico Guardasoni, operatic tenor (b. c.1731)
August 10 – Michael Haydn, composer (b. 1737)
date unknown
Brigida Banti, operatic soprano (b. 1757)
José de Larrañaga, organist and composer (b. 1728)
Charles Le Picq, dancer and choreographer (b. 1744)

 
19th century in music
Music by year